Bruno Beger (27 April 1911 – 12 October 2009) was a German racial anthropologist, ethnologist, and explorer who worked for the Ahnenerbe. In that role he participated in Ernst Schäfer's 1938–39 journey to Tibet, helped the Race and Settlement Office, or SS-Rasse- und Siedlungshauptamt, of the SS identify Jews, and later helped select human subjects to be killed to create an anatomical study collection of Jewish skulls.

Early life

Beger was born in 1911 to an old Heidelberg family that soon after came upon hard times when Beger's father was killed in World War I, but a family friend paid for him to attend the University of Jena where he was first exposed to Hans F. K. Günther during a lecture, a man who would encourage him through his early academic career in anthropology and ethnology.

Service in the SS
In 1934, Beger began working a part-time job in the Race and Settlement Office of the SS where he eventually became a section head. Beger was asked to be part of an expedition to Hawaii, but while this was awaiting final approval, he was invited on a trip to Tibet led by Ernst Schäfer which he accepted instead.

In a proposal he wrote to Schäfer, Beger stated his contribution to the expedition would be "to study the current racial-anthropological situation through measurements, trait research, photography and moulds... and to collect material about the proportion, origins, significance and development of the Nordic race in this region."

1938–39 expedition to Tibet
All through the expedition, Beger kept a travel diary which was published in book form 60 years later, Mit der deutschen Tibetexpedition Ernst Schäfer 1938/39 nach Lhasa (Wiesbaden, 1998). Only 50 copies of it exist.

Jewish skull collection

Beger worked together with August Hirt at the Reichsuniversität Straßburg. His assignment, which he carried out, was to provide the Nazi doctor with detainees of diverse ethnic types from various concentration camps in order to serve Hirt's lethal racial experiments. The work involved selecting over 100 individuals from Auschwitz to be murdered for their skulls and exhibited as the Jewish skull collection. They were mainly Jews, and the crime was exposed during the Nuremberg trials in 1946. The collection was sanctioned by Reichsführer-SS Heinrich Himmler, and designed by and under the direction of August Hirt, with Rudolf Brandt and Wolfram Sievers, general manager of the Ahnenerbe, being responsible for procuring and preparing the corpses.
The victims were sent to Natzweiler concentration camp for gassing by SS-Hauptsturmführer Joseph Kramer, the Kommandant of the camp. Their corpses were then sent to Hirt in Strasburg. In these endeavours he was assisted by doctors Hans Endres, Hans Fleischhacker, Heinrich Rübel and Rudolf Trojan.

After the war
In February 1948, Beger was classified as "exonerated" by a denazification tribunal unaware of his role in the skull collection. In 1960, an investigation into the collection began in Ludwigsburg, and Beger was taken into custody on 30 March 1960. He was released four months later.

The investigation continued until coming to trial on 27 October 1970. Beger claimed that he was unaware the Auschwitz prisoners he measured were to be killed. While two others indicted in the trial were released, Beger was convicted on 6 April 1971, and sentenced to three years in prison for being an accomplice in the murder of 86 Jews. Upon appeal his sentence was reduced to three years of probation. Neither of his colleagues with whom he was tried, Hans Fleischhacker and Wolf-Dietrich Wolff, were convicted.

According to his family, Beger died in Königstein im Taunus on 12 October 2009.

See also
SS-Rasse- und Siedlungshauptamt

Published work
Meine Begenungen mit dem Ozean des Wissens, Kurt und Dieter Schwartz, Königstein, 1986, 11 pages. Broschüre zum 75. Geburtstag von Bruno Beger in einer Auflage von 250 Stück. OCLC 611195622.
Mit der deutschen Tibetexpedition Ernst Schäfer 1938/39 nach Lhasa, Schwartz, Wiesbaden, 1998, 280 pages. Notes: Includes text of: Geheimnis Tibet: erster Bericht der Deutschen Tibet-Expedition Ernst Schäfer. München: Verlag F. Bruckmann, 1943. Contains an essay by Bruno Beger who was part of the expedition. Maps on lining papers. Description: xxxi, 249 p. : ill. (some col.), col. maps; 26 cm. ; 3935102356. OCLC Numbers: 660670280; 163817098.
 Czwienk, Jürgen, and Georg Graffe. 2004. Die Expeditionen der Nazis Abenteuer und Rassenwahn. Gescher: PolarFilm. Notes: Filmbericht, Deutschland 2004. - Extras: 2 Bonusfilme: Burma Road (41 Min.), China: 1932 - 1935 (15 Min.). Performer(s): Mit: Ernst Schäfer, Bruno Beger. Description: 1 DVD-Video (Ländercode 0, 50 + 56 Min.): s/w, Dolby digital stereo. 12 cm. Responsibility: ein Film von Jürgen Czwienk und Georg Graffe.  ; 9783937163475. OCLC Number: 314606494.
 Beger, Bruno. 1964. Es war in Tibet: Erlebtes im Himalaya und in Tibet. Frankfurt: Akademie für das Graphische Gewerbe. Herstellung: Semesterarbeit von Friedrich Beger. OCLC 611114953.
 Beger, Bruno. 1941. Die Bevölkerung der altmärkischen Wische: eine rassenkundliche Untersuchung. @Berlin, Univ., Math.-Naturwiss. Fak., Diss., 1941. OCLC 252078607.

References

Further reading
Hale, Christopher. Himmler's Crusade: the True Story of the 1938 Nazi Expedition into Tibet Bantam, 2004. 

1911 births
2009 deaths
German anthropologists
German ethnologists
Scientists from Frankfurt
Proponents of scientific racism
SS-Hauptsturmführer
University of Jena alumni
20th-century anthropologists
Ahnenerbe members
Auschwitz concentration camp medical personnel
Holocaust perpetrators in Poland